Saintly (21 September 1992 – 16 December 2016) was an Australian Thoroughbred racehorse who was named Australia's champion racehorse in 1997.  A giant chestnut gelding by Sky Chase out of All Grace (by Sir Tristram), he was bred by his trainer, Bart Cummings, who owned him in partnership with a Malaysian businessman, Dato Tan Chin Nam. In 2017 Saintly was inducted to the Australian Racing Hall of Fame.

Saintly gained the moniker 'The horse from heaven' due to his name and his partnership with jockey Darren Beadman, who at the time was a proclaimed born-again Christian.

Race career 
Saintly broke his maiden as a two-year-old, on 19 April 1995, and returned in the latter part of the spring, at three, where he won three races, including the Listed Carbine Club Stakes at Flemington.  He opened the new year by defeating the well-performed Juggler in the Expressway Stakes, and won the Australian Cup two starts later.  He was then placed behind Octagonal in the Rosehill Guineas, the Mercedes Classic, and the Australian Derby, and finished in front of Nothin' Leica Dane and Filante, in what was considered a vintage crop of three-year-olds.

At four, Saintly was runner-up to Filante in the Warwick and the Chelmsford Stakes, won the Hill Stakes at his third run back, and was surprisingly defeated by Adventurous, Hula Flight, and Nothin' Leica Dane in the Craven Plate and The Metropolitan.  In Melbourne, however, he found his best form.  He charged home to beat Filante in the Cox Plate and backed up 10 days later for an easy win in the Melbourne Cup.  He was just the fourth horse to complete the double in the same year, following Nightmarch (1929), Phar Lap (1930), and Rising Fast (1954), and preceding Makybe Diva (2005).

After missing the Japan Cup through illness, Saintly returned in the Orr Stakes, and came from well back on the home turn to defeat Cut Up Rough.  Bart Cummings declared Saintly hadn't yet reached his peak as a racehorse, but he broke down without racing again.  Over the next 18 months, Cummings made several attempts to get Saintly back to the track, but without success, and he was retired in July 1998.

Retirement 

Saintly originally resided at Living Legends, the international home of rest for champion horses (open to the public) in Greenvale, Melbourne, Australia, but as of February 2007, Saintly has returned home to Bart Cummings' Princes Farm in New South Wales.

Saintly died at the age of 24 on 16 December 2016.

Race record

Pedigree

See also
 List of millionaire racehorses in Australia
 List of Melbourne Cup winners

References

 Saintly's pedigree and partial racing stats

External links
 Official Living Legends Site
 
 Saintly Profile of a Champion

1992 racehorse births
2016 racehorse deaths
Australian Champion Racehorse of the Year
Racehorses bred in Australia
Racehorses trained in Australia
Melbourne Cup winners
Cox Plate winners
Thoroughbred family 5-d